Stellognatha is a genus of beetle belonging to the family Cerambycidae.

Species
 Stellognatha maculata (Olivier, 1795)

References
 Biolib
 F. VITALI -Cerambycoidea

Sternotomini